Controlled waste is waste that is subject to legislative control in either its handling or its disposal. As a legal term, Controlled waste applies exclusively to the UK but the concept is enshrined in laws of many other countries. The types of waste covered  includes domestic, commercial and industrial waste.  They are regulated  because of their toxicity, their hazardous nature or their capability to do harm to human health or the environment either now or at some time in the future. A prime concern is the effects of biodegradation or biochemical degradation and the by-products produced.

References

See also
List of waste types
Waste management

Waste